Aldis is a given name (predominantly Latvian and masculine) and a surname.

Notable people with the name include:

Given name
Aldis Bernard (c. 1810 – 1876), Canadian politician and mayor of Montreal
Aldis Bērziņš (born 1956), Latvian-American volleyball player and Olympic medalist
Aldis Eglājs (born 1936), Latvian sailboat designer and builder 
Aldis Gobzems (born 1978), Latvian politician
Aldis Hodge (born 1986), American film and television actor
Aldis Intlers (1965–1994), Latvian bobsledder and Olympic competitor
Aldis Kļaviņš (1975–2000), Latvian slalom canoeist and Olympic competitor
Aldis Kušķis (born 1965), Latvian politician

Surname
 Archie Aldis Emmerson (born 1929), American businessman
 Asa Aldis (1770–1847), American lawyer and judge
 Asa O. Aldis (1811–1891), American lawyer and diplomat
 Charles Aldis (1776–1863), English surgeon
 Charles James Berridge Aldis (1808–1872), English physician
 Dorothy Aldis (1896–1966), American children's author and poet
 John Aldis (Massachusetts) (1600s), American politician
 Mary Aldis (playwright) (1872–1949), American playwright
 Mary Aldis (science writer) (c. 1838 – 1897), New Zealander science writer
 Nathan Aldis (1600s), American settler
 William Aldis Wright (1831–1914), English editor
 Mickie James-Aldis (born 1979), American professional wrestler

See also 

 Aldis (disambiguation)

Latvian masculine given names